Shadi Mustafa Skaf (born 9 February 1994) is a Lebanese professional footballer who plays as a centre-back for  club Bourj.

Club career

Lebanon 
Coming through the youth system, Skaf began his career at Islah Bourj Shmali in the 2010–11 Lebanese Premier League. In 2011 he was awarded Lebanese Young Player of the Year. On 8 July 2013, Skaf joined Nejmeh, before moving to Nabi Chit on 13 October 2015.

On 17 August 2016, Skaf was signed by Salam Zgharta. After having terminated his contract with Salam, Tadamon Sour announced the signing of Skaf on a four-year contract on 5 July 2017. On 3 August 2018, Skaf joined Akhaa Ahli Aley. After three years at the club, on 7 June 2021, he moved to Bourj.

Churchill Brothers 
Skaf moved abroad, joining I-League side Churchill Brothers on 20 August 2021. He made his debut in their 1–0 defeat to Gokulam Kerala on 26 December. On 12 January 2022, the club announced that the two had parted ways on mutual terms.

International career 
Having also captained the under-20 team at the 2013 Jeux de la Francophonie, Skaf represented Lebanon at under-23 level in 2015, playing four games in the 2016 AFC U-23 Championship qualification.

Honours
Nejmeh
 Lebanese Premier League: 2013–14
 Lebanese FA Cup: 2015–16; runner-up: 2014–15
 Lebanese Elite Cup: 2014; runner-up: 2013
 Lebanese Super Cup: 2014

Salam Zgharta
 Lebanese Challenge Cup runner-up: 2016

Tadamon Sour
 Lebanese Challenge Cup runner-up: 2017

Individual
 Lebanese Premier League Best Young Player: 2010–11

References

External links

 
 
 

1994 births
Living people
People from Tyre District
Lebanese footballers
Association football central defenders
Islah Borj Al Shmali Club players
Nejmeh SC players
Al Nabi Chit SC players
Salam Zgharta FC players
Tadamon Sour SC players
Akhaa Ahli Aley FC players
Bourj FC players
Churchill Brothers FC Goa players
Lebanese Premier League players
Lebanese Second Division players
I-League players
Lebanon youth international footballers
Lebanese expatriate footballers
Lebanese expatriate sportspeople in India
Expatriate footballers in India